At Rush Hour the Cars is the debut album by Canadian indie rock band Royal City, released in 2000 on Three Gut Records.

Track listing
 "O You With Flowers" – 3:20
 "At Rush Hour the Cars" – 5:00
 "I'm Taking the Train" – 2:10
 "You Strutted and Fretted Across" – 3:23
 "I Am a Raw Youth" – 2:29
 "The Sound of the Streetcars" – 4:24
 "Baby Let Your Heart Out" – 2:57
 "Rosy My Cheek" – 4:19
 "I Can See" – 1:29
 "In Havana the Stars" – 1:37
 "I Want to Go Everywhere" – 2:02
 "Codeine & Shakespeare" – 2:53
 "I'd Never Be Anything" – 4:51

References

2000 debut albums
Royal City (band) albums
Three Gut Records albums